EarthPoint.us maps southwest Idaho real estate listings onto Google Earth and Google Maps.

Earth Point also maps the United States Public Land Survey System onto Google Earth.

Features
 Properties are located with roof-top accuracy without relying on geocoding.
 Property lines are drawn.
 Properties are defined by ESRI shape files produced by county assessor offices. These files are converted by Earth Point for use on Google Earth and Google Maps. 
 Property for Sale - maps MLS listings in Ada and Canyon counties, Idaho.
 County Assessor Data - maps any property in Ada or Canyon counties, whether or not it is for sale.  Displays county assessor information including address, legal description, and assessed value.  For Ada county, displays a picture of the property and the zoning.
 Township and Range - maps the United States Public Land Survey System onto Google Earth.
 Excel To Kml - upload spreadsheet data onto Google Earth.

References

External links
 Earth Point web-site

Companies based in Idaho
Geographic information systems
Real estate companies of the United States
Online financial services companies of the United States
Land surveying systems
Companies with year of establishment missing